Théodore Varvier (29 April 1884, in Lyon – 25 August 1913) was a French rugby union player, who played for the France national rugby union team.

Career

Club

 US Métro

International

 He played his first test match on 2 March 1906 against the England national rugby union team. His last test match was against Ireland national rugby union team on the first of January 1912.
 6 caps (successively playing flyhalf, centre and rear).
 Caps by year : 1 in 1906, 2 in 1909, 2 in 1911, 1 in 1912.

References
 Godwin, Terry Complete Who's Who of International Rugby (Cassell, 1987)

External links 
Statistiques par scrum.com

France international rugby union players
French rugby union players
1884 births
Sportspeople from Lyon
1913 deaths
French military personnel killed in World War I